Linder Glacier is a steep tributary glacier in the Lanterman Range, Bowers Mountains, Antarctica. It drains the southern slopes of Mount Bernstein and moves south to enter Hunter Glacier. The glacier was mapped by the United States Geological Survey from surveys and U.S. Navy air photos, 1960–62, and was named by the Advisory Committee on Antarctic Names for Lieutenant Michael A. Linder, U.S. Navy Reserve, a communications and administrative officer with the McMurdo Station winter party, 1967.

References

Glaciers of Pennell Coast